FIBA Asia Under-18 Championship for Women 2010 is FIBA Asia's basketball championship for females under 18 years old. The games were held at Surat Thani, Thailand.

The championship is divided into "Level I" and "Level II".

Participating teams

Preliminary round

Level I

Level II

Qualifying round
Winners are promoted to Level I for the 2012 championships.

Final round

Semifinals

3rd place

Final

Final standing

Awards

External links
Official Website

2012
2010 in women's basketball
2009–10 in Asian basketball
2009–10 in Thai basketball
International women's basketball competitions hosted by Thailand
2010 in youth sport